Bughio is a clan of the Jakhrani tribe in Sindh, Pakistan.

References

Samma tribes
Sindhi tribes